Arthur Pendleton Bagby (1794 – September 21, 1858) was an enslaver and the tenth Governor of the U.S. state of Alabama from 1837 to 1841. Born in Louisa County, Virginia, in 1794, he studied law and was admitted to the bar in 1819, practicing in Claiborne, Alabama. He was a member of the Alabama State House of Representatives in 1821, 1822, 1824, and 1834–1836, serving as the youngest-ever speaker in 1822 and 1836, and he served in the Alabama State Senate in 1825. He served in the U.S. Senate from November 21, 1841, when he was elected to fill the vacancy caused by Clement C. Clay's resignation, to June 16, 1848, when he resigned to become Minister to Russia from 1848 to 1849.

During his time in the Senate, he was chairman of the Committee on Territories, the Committee on Claims, and the Committee on Indian Affairs. As a Senator, he supported the annexation of Texas. Bagby died in 1858 in Mobile, Alabama, and he is interred in Magnolia Cemetery there.

Panic of 1837
During Bagby's administration, the country was plagued by economic depression due to the Panic of 1837. Bagby introduced measures to assist the state banks, but the state legislature rejected most measures. All the state banks were closed by Bagby's successor, Governor Benjamin Fitzpatrick.

Arthur P. Bagby, Jr
His son, Arthur P. Bagby, Jr., was a Confederate colonel in the Civil War, who was assigned to command as a brigadier general on April 13, 1864, to rank from March 17, 1864, and as a major general on May 16, 1865, to rank from May 10, 1865, by General Edmund Kirby Smith in the Trans-Mississippi Department. Neither appointment was confirmed by the Confederate Senate, which had held its final session before the major general assignment. Bagby's first wife, Emily Steele of Georgia, died in 1825 and is buried in Claiborne, Alabama.

References

 Retrieved on 2008-08-10
 Eicher, John H., and David J. Eicher, Civil War High Commands. Stanford: Stanford University Press, 2001. . p. 588.

External links

Alabama Department of Archives and History 
Address of His Excellency Governor Bagby, when inducting into office the president of the University of Alabama; together with the address of the president, Rev. Basil Manly. Delivered in the Rotunda, on commencement day, December 6, 1837, Tuscaloosa, Ala., Ferguson & Eaton, Printers, 1838. From the University Libraries Division of Special Collections, The University of Alabama.

1794 births
1858 deaths
People from Louisa County, Virginia
Democratic Party governors of Alabama
Democratic Party members of the Alabama House of Representatives
Democratic Party Alabama state senators
Alabama lawyers
Ambassadors of the United States to Russia
Democratic Party United States senators from Alabama
19th-century American diplomats
Speakers of the Alabama House of Representatives
19th-century American politicians
19th-century American lawyers